Big Monster Toys, LLC (BMT), established in May 1988, is a United States-based toy and game inventing and licensing company.

History 
Big Monster Toys was founded in 1988 by Jeff Breslow, Howard Morrison, and Rouben Terzian, three former partners of Marvin Glass & Associates. MGA was one of the pioneers of the post-World War II American toy industry. Breslow, Morrison, and Terzian teamed with two principal designers from MGA, Don Rosenwinkel and John Zaruba. Together, they formed Breslow Morrison Terzian & Associates" (the initial basis of the "BMT" acronym).

About 
Big Monster Toys is located in the West Loop of Chicago. Their facilities include an audio recording studio, a full machine shop, plastic molding, electronic design, software programming, 3D printing, a paint shop, exercise equipment, and a digital video authorship and editing facility.

Big Monster Toys invents and engineers toys from concept to prototype. BMT also helps to develop the marketing position, product name, packaging and promotional material for the toys. BMT licenses toys to companies throughout the world. Their clients include Mattel, Hasbro (and formley Tiger Electronics), Moose, Spin Master, Goliath, Playmates Toys.

BMT has won numerous industry awards, and is considered a positive supporter of toy invention and the toy industry. Breslow, Morrison, and Terzian were inducted into the Toy Industry Hall of Fame, in 1998, for their successful 31-year collaborative efforts.

References

External links 
Big Monster Toys homepage

Companies based in Chicago
Toy companies established in 1988
Toy companies of the United States